George Groenewald (Ewald) Bonzet (25 December 1951 – 7 September 2016) was a South African Track and Road runner. At his time he was the National record holder in various distances.

Early days

Bonzet was born in Caledon, Western Cape South Africa. His father was a Train Station Master. He attend Epping High School (today known as Goodwood College) He qualified as a Health Inspector at Cape Technikon Later the Technikon merged and became the Cape Peninsula University of Technology. He is married to Rene and have one child. He was a Steam Train Enthusiast.

Running career

Bonzet ran in the colours of Bellville Athletics club

Award
In 1982 he received the Reggie Walker medal. This medal was presented by Athletics South Africa for excellent performances through the years.

References 

1951 births
2016 deaths
South African male middle-distance runners
South African male steeplechase runners
South African male marathon runners